Sezela is a small town on the mouth of iSezela River in KwaZulu-Natal, South Africa. The town is 78.7 km south of Durban. It is notable for its large sugar mill.

Etymology
The river and the town are named after a crocodile. In 1828, the Zulu king, Shaka, hunted down a man-eating crocodile here. The crocodile was called iSezela meaning the one who finds by smell, for it was said that the crocodile hunted like a wild dog following a trail.

History
In 1915, the Reynolds Brothers opened a sugar mill at Sezela. This was later purchased by C. G. Smith, then by Illovo Sugar, and finally by Associated British Foods. In his book, Duncan du Bois describes in detail the ill treatment of the Indian indentured labourers who were brought from India to work in the mill. The workers had the choice to return to India after their indenture contract had expired, yet they chose to stay behind to develop this 'unknown area' into Sezela. Sezela was the only Indian settlement alongside the sea in those early years of the Indian colonisation of Natal.

As the town (village) sprang up, the citizens were initially separated by a race/employment band. Originally, all management positions were reserved for the white race, per Apartheid legislation. Sezela was subdivided into districts: New Dheli; Oceanvale; Lower Sezela; and Upper Sezela (sadly, the latter two districts no longer exist). Sezela boasts two country clubs (Club Blue Horizon and Sezela Country Club) and two primary schools (once called Sezela State Aided Indian and Sezela Primary, the names of the schools were changed after 1994 to acclimatise with the new political atmosphere). The state aided school was heavily subsidised by the local sugar mill. The school, in honour of the subsidy, named their athletics 'houses' after the pioneer sugar magnates.

On 13 August 1954, a whaling vessel belonging to The Union Whaling Company of Durban ran aground on the rocks of Umdoni Point. Due to windstorm and rough seas, the SS Uni X lost a propeller and in the windstorm was blown towards the shore. 13 Sailors were rescued by the Scottburgh Life Saving Club. When the tide is low, one can clearly see some of the remains of this wreck. Parts of this ship are currently on display at Sezela and Selborne Country Club.

Sezela barracks
One of the oldest residents to have been born in the Sezela Barracks is 89-year-old Poinamma Pillay, whose father had three wives and eleven children (three daughters and eight sons). "We all grew up in Sezela barracks where we had to share communal toilets and bathing facilities with other neighbours," she said.

"It was a hard life and my grand-father, who was from India, didn't want me to attend school. He was of the view that even if girls get educated, they must finally get married and serve their husbands.

"I was married at the age of elven to my husband who was from the Beneva sugar estate nearby. We stayed in Beneva for some time before we moved to Lower Sezela and Esperanza.

"I had ten children: four boys and six girls," she said. Her husband, two sons and three daughters are now deceased. She now lives with a daughter in the New Delhi area of Sezela.

Another field hand and sugar factory worker who grew up in Sezela barracks is 74-year-old Chellan Chinappen. He retired in 1997 after working for Illovo Sugar for 44 years. He was part of a large family of four brothers and three sisters. His father, Chinnakanu, and mother, Muniamma, moved to Sezela barracks from the Nagoli sugar estate when he was about ten-years-old. He attended the local Sezela State Aided Indian School and started work as a field hand at the age of fifteen. "Life was very tough for all of us where we all had to live in compounds made of wood and iron and had to use communal toilets and water.

"It was only sometime later that the company built the block houses. But we still did not have inside toilets and water. For many years we had to stand in long queues to use the toilets and bathing facilities. It was not good.

"Only after many representations and petitions that the company thought we deserve our own toilets, water and electricity," said Mr Chinappen.

Mr Chinappen, who was the chairman of the Sezela Barracks Indian Council for 20 years, said in the early days about 20,000 people lived in the Sezela Barracks, Lower Sezela, Upper Sezela, Bazley and Brake Barracks. Like other sugar estates, Sezela residents had also built their own temples and churches. "Today there are only about 200 families living in the old Sezela barracks and in the recently-established New Delhi area," he said.

A number of young people have followed in the footsteps of their parents and work at the Sezela sugar mill as technicians, clerks, and managers. One of the young men working at the mill is 42-year-old Sidney Murthy. He has worked at the mill for the past 17 years and lives in one of the original block houses, which he has improved and renovated.

"My father was born here, and my three sisters and I were born here. My grandfather came from India," he said. "I have purchased this house from the company, and we love this place because it is quiet, peaceful and right next door to the beach. A number of outside people have purchased property here after the old residents moved out," he said.

 The remaining Sezela residents still send their children to the local Sezela Primary School and maintain and promote their cultures and traditions through the local Sezela Siva Subramaniam Temple and three churches. Most of the young people have migrated to other areas – especially Durban and Johannesburg. (Simple life back in the days submitted by:Treio Pilay).

Geography
Sezela benefits from the long, favourable shorelines of the Indian Ocean. The fishing grounds are extremely good and the annual sardine run is enjoyed both by locals and visitors. Sezela's famous fishing grounds are : Dazingaan; Shad Cutting (a place where shad get stranded when tide goes out); Mamba Drain (from here locals frequently spot black mambas swimming in this channel); Mill Rock (these rocks are directly opposite the mill); Gornna Rock (ex local engineer's favourite fishing rock); Ruben Bay (a boy by the name Ruben drowned in this bay); "A" Frame (named after the A-shaped steel structure of the nearby railway siding); and Washing Rocks (which locals use to wash their clothes).

Architecture

Sezela Temple
The original Temple was built during the early 1930s with brick walls and a metal roof. A wood and iron hall was built adjacent to the Temple. This hall was used for weddings, the showing of films, and other cultural functions. During the early 1940s this hall was used as an English Primary school. The premises was also used by the Saiva Sithantha Sungam on Sunday mornings for their Sunday Services.

During the year 1969, the Temple was demolished and relocated to its present site, Lot 70, Syringa Lane. The Temple observes all the festivals in accordance with the Tamil Panchangam. In the context of Murugan worship, the Thaipoosam Kavady Festival is observed annually. During the year 2015, approximately 35 Kavady-bearers offered the Kavady to Lord Murugan on the Main Thaipoosam Kavady Festival Day.

Demographics

Religion
Sezela is rich in terms of culture and religion. In this small town you can find the following friendly churches: Adonai Baptist; Emmanuel (ECSA); and Prevailing Word Fellowship (Pst.N Sivalingam). There is also a local Siva Subramaniam Temple. The temple hosts Kavadi Attam around January/February annually. All these religious institutions are well run and attended by the local community.

Notable people
Well known Sezela families are the Muthus; the Georges; the Sivalingams; the Mariemuthus; the Mudrais; the Chinsammy-Pillay family; the De Villiers'; the Hulley's and the Vissers. The third generation of these families (and for some, the fourth) remain residents of Sezela.
Well known Sezela State Aided Primary School teachers are: Mr. A.A. Govender; MR. K.K. Arumugaam; Mrs. M.A.V. Ramiah; Ms. A. Puckree; the late Mr. A. Banjan; Mrs. S.S. Banjan; the late Mr. B. Naidoo; Mrs. V. Reddy (née Naidoo); and Mr. K.P. Reddy.

Like other sugar estates, Sezela has also produced many teachers, doctors, lawyers, chartered accountants, engineers, business people and other professional individuals. Commonwealth finalist (2016), Lucy Peters has her roots in Sezela.

Sports
Sezela's well-known soccer clubs are the Eagles and the Dheli Falcons. Sezela is also home to Massam's Confectionery.

References

Further reading
http://jedidiahtrust.co.za/sandbox/wp-content/uploads/2014/07/Press_Release_Mid_South_Coast_Rising_Sun_March_4-10_2014.pdf
https://hope4aidssouthafrica.wordpress.com/positive-ray/positive-ray-emmanuel/
http://scnc.ukzn.ac.za/doc/B/Roots/Roots-mounted-on-web/1983/9_1983_V6_Moonsamy_M_History_Mrs_Paramamma_Samuel_and_Parents.pdf
http://scnc.ukzn.ac.za/doc/B/Roots/Roots-mounted-on-web/1983/6_1983_V2_Dorkin_W_Untitled.pdf

Populated places in the Umdoni Local Municipality
KwaZulu-Natal South Coast